Sasha Bianca Lane (born September 29, 1995) is an American actress. She made her film debut in American Honey (2016), directed by Andrea Arnold, before portraying Hunter C-20 in the first season of the Disney+ television series Loki, set in the Marvel Cinematic Universe.

Early life
Lane was born in Houston, Texas, and grew up in Dallas, Texas. Her father is African-American, and her mother, who is from New Zealand, is of Māori descent. After her parents divorced when she was young, Lane went to live with her mother, moving several times near Dallas before settling in Frisco, Texas. She has one brother, Sergio D'Arcy, who is gay. Prior to becoming an actress, Lane attended Liberty High School,
where she was a stand-out athlete on the basketball and track and field teams, and also worked as a hostess at an On the Border in Frisco.
 
 Lane graduated high school in 2014, and went on to attend Texas State University in San Marcos, Texas, but left.

Career
Lane made her film debut in the critically acclaimed and award-winning American Honey (2016), a film about magazine crews, written and directed by Andrea Arnold, starring opposite Shia LaBeouf and Riley Keough. Arnold spotted Lane sunbathing on a beach while on spring break. Lane said in an interview that she "felt Arnold's vibe and decided to trust Arnold for an audition."

The film had its world premiere on May 15, 2016, at the Cannes Film Festival, where it won the Prix du Jury. The film was released in a limited release on September 30, 2016, by A24. In 2017, Lane starred in Born in the Maelstrom, a short film directed by Meryam Joobeur. In 2018, Lane starred in Hearts Beat Loud, opposite Nick Offerman and Kiersey Clemons, directed by Brett Haley, and The Miseducation of Cameron Post directed by Desiree Akhavan. The Miseducation of Cameron Post won Top Prize at the 2018 Sundance Film Festival and has been praised for its “sensitive, understated portrayal of adolescent self-doubt and discovery.”  In 2019, Lane played Alice Monaghan in Hellboy, directed by Neil Marshall.

She appeared in horror thriller film Daniel Isn't Real (2019), directed by Adam Egypt Mortimer.

In 2020, Lane starred in an episode of Amazing Stories for Apple TV+ executive produced by Steven Spielberg. She then starred in Utopia created by Gillian Flynn, an American remake of the British television show of the same name for Amazon Prime Video. In May 2020, she was cast in Loki, which premiered in June 2021.

In February 2021, she was cast in Conversations with Friends, an adaptation of Sally Rooney's 2017 debut novel.

Personal life
In 2015, Lane came out as bisexual, and she described herself as gay in 2018. In 2020, she gave birth to a daughter.

Lane has schizoaffective disorder. As of 2016, she lives in Los Angeles.

Filmography

Film

Television

Podcast

Music video

Accolades

References

External links
 
 

1995 births
21st-century African-American people
21st-century African-American women
21st-century American actresses
Actresses from Dallas
Actresses from Houston
Actresses from Los Angeles
African-American actresses
American film actresses
American lesbian actresses
American people of Māori descent
American people of New Zealand descent
LGBT African Americans
LGBT people from Texas
Living people
People from Frisco, Texas
People with schizoaffective disorder
Texas State University alumni